Bailey (2001 pop.: approximately 98) is a Canadian rural community in Sunbury County, New Brunswick.

It has an elevation of 764 ft. The telephone area code for Bailey: (506)

See also
List of communities in New Brunswick

References

Communities in Sunbury County, New Brunswick